The 1901 Notre Dame football team was an American football team that represented the University of Notre Dame in the 1901 college football season. In its second season with Pat O'Dea as coach, the team compiled an 8–1–1 record, shut out six opponents, and outscored all opponents by a total of 145 to 19. Al Fortin was the team captain.

With victories over Purdue and Indiana, Notre Dame was declared to be the Indiana state champion. Only four of the games played were deemed "championship games": Northwestern, Beloit, Indiana, and Purdue.

Fullback Louis J. Salmon starred on the 1901 team. At a post-season meeting on November 29, 1901, Salmon was unanimously elected as captain of the 1902 Notre Dame football team. At the same meeting, varsity letters were presented to 14 players for their participation on the 1901 team: Lonergan, Lins and Nyere, ends; Faragher and Fortin, tackles; Gillen, Winters, Piele, O'Malley, guards; Pick, center; Henry J. McGlew, quarterback; Doran and Kirby, halfbacks; and Salmon, fullback.

Schedule

References

Notre Dame
Notre Dame Fighting Irish football seasons
Notre Dame football